Con Todo is a worship album of Christian Contemporary music by Hillsong Church in Spanish that was released on 8 June 2010. The album includes a selection of 14 songs by Hillsong translated and recorded in Spanish featuring Darlene Zschech, Reuben Morgan and other members of the Hillsong Worship Team. The album won the award for Spanish Language Album of the Year at the 42nd GMA Dove Awards.

Track listing

Production and recording
Each song includes the original instrumental recording of each song with the lead and backing vocals re-recorded in Spanish.

Release
A free download was made of both "Hosanna" and "Para Exaltarte" (the Spanish version of "Your Name High") on Hillsong's website by subscribing to their Spanish newsletter. The album is charted #29 on the Top Latin Albums and #4 on the Latin Pop Albums chart.
Two years later, the album remains in the iTunes Latin charts.

References

2010 albums
Hillsong Music albums
Spanish-language albums